The División Intermedia, the second division of Peruvian football (soccer) in 1984 until 1987. The tournament was played on a home-and-away round-robin basis.

Metropolitan Region

Intermedia A

Intermedia B

North

South

Pre-Liguilla

Liguilla de Promoción

North Region

Center Region

South Region

External links
 RSSSF

2
Peru